Datta may refer to:

 Dutta (surname), an Indian family name found among Bengali and Punjabi Hindus
 Dattatreya, a Hindu deity
 Datta, Khyber Pakhtunkhwa, a Union Council of Mansehra District in Khyber-Pakhtunkhwa
 Data, Hisar or Datta, a village in Haryana, India
 Datta High School, a higher secondary school in the city of Netrakona, Bangladesh
 Datta (film), 1951 and 1976 Bengali films based on the story of Sarat Chandra Chattopadhyay